Epicho is a village in the Nicosia District of Cyprus, located near Exometochi. De facto, it is under the control of Northern Cyprus.

References

Communities in Nicosia District
Populated places in Lefkoşa District